"Old MacDonald Had a Farm" (sometimes shortened to Old MacDonald) is a traditional children's song and nursery rhyme about a farmer and the various animals he keeps. Each verse of the song changes the name of the animal and its respective noise. For example, if the verse uses a cow as the animal, then "moo" would be used as the animal's sound. In many versions, the song is cumulative, with the animal sounds from all the earlier verses added to each subsequent verse. 

The song was probably written by Thomas d'Urfey for an opera in 1706, before existing as a folk song in Britain, Ireland and North America for hundreds of years in various forms then finally being standardised in the twentieth century. It has a Roud Folk Song Index number of 745. 

The lyrics to the standard version begin as follows, with the animal sound changing with each verse:

History

Thomas d'Urfey 
The earliest variant of the song is "In the Fields in Frost and Snow" from a 1706 opera called The Kingdom of the Birds or Wonders of the Sun written by the English writer and composer Thomas d'Urfey. This version begins:In the Fields in Frost and Snows,
Watching late and early;
There I keep my Father's Cows,
There I Milk 'em Yearly:
Booing here, Booing there,
Here a Boo, there a Boo, every where a Boo,
We defy all Care and Strife,
In a Charming Country-Life.It is unknown whether this was the origin of the song, or if his version of the song was based on a traditional song already in existence. Like modern versions, the animals change from verse to verse and the rhythm is very similar, but it uses a different minor key melody.

D'Urfey's opera was largely unsuccessful, but the song was recycled, being expanded and printed in d'Urfey's own Wit and Mirth, or Pills to Purge Melancholy, vol. 2 (1719) and appearing in several operas throughout the eighteenth century such as John Gay and Johann Christoph Pepusch's Polly (1729). It also appeared on song sheets for decades, so it was presumably popular among ordinary English people in the eighteenth century whether it originated from the opera or not.

Traditional English versions 
Several versions were collected in England in around the turn of the twentieth century by folklorists, such as one called "The Farmyard Song" taken from a John Lloyd of Manchester in the 1880s by Anne Gilchrist, and another called "Father's Wood I O" collected in 1906 in Scotter, Lincolnshire by Percy Grainger; both of the original transcriptions of these versions are available via the Vaughan Williams Memorial Library website.

The famous folk song collector Cecil Sharp collected a version called "The Farmyard" in 1908 from a 74-year-old named Mrs. Goodey at Marylebone Workhouse, London; and the lyrics began with the following verse:
Up was I on my father's farm
On a May day morning early;
Feeding of my father's cows
On a May day morning early,
With a moo moo here and a moo moo there,
Here a moo, there a moo, Here a pretty moo.
Six pretty maids come and gang a-long o' me
To the merry green fields of the farm-yard.

Frederick Thomas Nettleingham's 1917 book Tommy's Tunes, a collection of World War I era songs, includes a variant of the song called "Ohio" which lists nine species: horses (neigh-neigh), dogs (bow-wow/woof woof/ruff ruff), chickens(hen=cluck cluck/chicks=chick chick), ducks (quack quack), goose (Honk Honk),  cows (moo moo), pigs (grunt grunt), cats (meow meow), sheep/goat (baa baa) and a donkey(MULE) (hee-haw). The farmer is called "Old Macdougal", unlike in most other traditional versions where the farmer is unnamed.Old Macdougal had a farm, E-I-E-I-O
And on that farm he had some dogs, E-I-E-I-O
With a bow-wow here, and a bow-wow there,
Here a bow, there a bow, everywhere a bow-wow.

Traditional Ozark versions 
The song seems to have been particularly popular in the Ozark region of the United States before being standardised. A version was published in Vance Randolph's Ozark Folksongs (1980) called "Old Missouri", sung by a Mr. H. F. Walker of Missouri in 1922. This version names different parts of the mule rather than different animals:Old Missouri had a mule, he-hi-he-hi-ho,
And on this mule there were two ears, he-hi-he-hi-ho.
With a flip-flop here and a flip-flop there,
And here a flop and there a flop and everywhere a flip-flop
Old Missouri had a mule, he-hi-he-hi-ho.Several traditional Ozark versions which differ significantly from the standard version were recorded in the 1950s and 60s by different collectors; these recordings are available on the University of Arkansas online digital collection.

Early recordings and origin of the famous version
The oldest version listed in The Traditional Ballad Index, is the Sam Patterson Trio's "Old MacDonald Had a Farm," released on the Edison label in 1925, followed by a version recorded by Gid Tanner and His Skillet Lickers in 1927. These recordings may be the first known versions to use the now standard tune, and the first to name the farmer "Old MacDonald". It is unknown what the traditional source of these iconic elements was, but the American versions seem most similar, with their E-I-E-I-O refrains and "old" farmers mentioned in the first line.

Translations

The lyrics have been translated from English into other languages and modified slightly to fit rhythmic and cultural requirements. In most languages below, it is still sung as a children's song to the same tune.

 In Afrikaans the song is called Ou Oom Klasie het 'n plaas (meaning "Old Uncle Claus has a farm").
 An Egyptian Arabic version of the song exists, with Geddo Ali (in Egyptian Arabic: جدو على, meaning "Grandpa Ali") as the farmer character.
 In Armenian, there is a translation under copyright by Karenn Presti published in 2017's My First Armenian Songbook.
 In Chinese, there are several versions of the song with same tune. The most popular is Wáng lǎo xiānshēng yǒu kuài dì (in Chinese: 王老先生有块地, meaning "Old Mr. Wang had some land").
 In Czech, it is Strýček Donald farmu měl (meaning "Uncle Donald had a farm").
 In Danish, it is Jens Hansen havde en bondegård (meaning "Jens Hansen had a farm").
 In Finnish, it is Piippolan vaarilla oli talo (meaning "Grandpa Piippola had a house").
 In French, it is Dans la ferme de Mathurin (meaning "In Mathurin's farm").
 In German, it is Onkel Jörg hat einen Bauernhof (meaning "Uncle Jörg has a farm"). An alternative version is Old MacDonald hat 'ne Farm (short for eine Farm), keeping the English name of the farmer, and translating the rest quite literally (meaning "Old MacDonald has a farm").
 In Hebrew, it is LaDod Moshe hayta chava (in Hebrew: לדוד משה הייתה חווה, meaning "Uncle Moses had a farm"). This version was translated by Avraham Broshi.
 In Italian, it is Nella vecchia fattoria (meaning "In the old farm"). The farmer is Zio Tobia (meaning "Uncle Tobias").
 In one Japanese version, it is Yukai-na Makiba (in Japanese: ゆかいな牧場, meaning "Happy farm"). Ichiro, Jiro, and Saburo are the farmers who have animals.
 In another Japanese version, it is Makku no Ojisan (in Japanese: マックのおじさん, meaning "Old man Mac"), sounds playfully like the Western version.
 In Kansai Japanese, there is a parody song called Osaka Umaimon no Uta (in Japanese: 大阪うまいもんの歌, meaning "Yummy foods in Osaka") made by an Osakan puppet play troupe in 1993.
 In Korean, it is Geulae geulaeseo (in Korean: '그래 그래서', meaning "Yes, so"). In this version, the farmer "Old Mr. Park" has a farm and animals.
 In Malay, it is Pak Atan Ada Ladang (meaning "Uncle Atan had a farm").
 In Persian, it is پیرمرد مهربون (meaning "Kind old man").
 In Polish, it is Stary Donald farmę miał (meaning "Old Donald had a farm") or Pan McDonald farmę miał (meaning "Mr. McDonald had a farm").
 In Portuguese, the most common version is Na quinta do tio Manel (meaning "On the farm of Uncle Manel"), with alternate versions being Seu Lobato tinha um sítio (meaning "Mr. Lobato had a site") or even O velho McDonald tinha uma fazenda (meaning "Old MacDonald had a farm").
 In Quebecois, the most common version is Le vieux Mac Donald a une ferme (meaning "Old Donald had a farm"), and is a literal translation from English.
 In Russian, unofficial variation:"Дед МакДональд напевал И-ай,и-ай,О!" Translated by Leonid Zuborev cyril.: Леонид Зуборев
 In Serbian, it is, "Na salašu dede mog" (meaning "On my grandpa's farm").
 In another Serbian version, it is Čika Pera ima farmu (meaning "Uncle Pera has a farm").
 In Slovene, it is Na kmetiji je lepo (meaning "On a farm it is beautiful"). It can be a children's song, but in some versions of the song, the lyrics have been made from childish into vulgar, like a drinking song.
 Some Spanish versions include En la granja de Pepito (meaning "On Pepito's farm"), El Viejo MacDonald tenía una granja (meaning "Old MacDonald had a farm"), El granjero tenía un campo (meaning "The farmer had a field"), or En la vieja factoría (meaning "In the old factory").. "En la granja del tío Juan"  (meaning "Uncle Juan's farm").
 In Swedish, it is Per Olsson hade en bonnagård (meaning "Per Olsson had a farm"). 

 In Ukrainian, it is Дід Іван корівку має (meaning "Uncle Ivan has a cow").
 In Urdu, it is عبد اللہ کا تھا ایک گاؤں (meaning "Abdullah had a village").

See also

List of animal sounds
Mary Had a Little Lamb

References

Year of song unknown
American folk songs
Elvis Presley songs
Frank Sinatra songs
American children's songs
Traditional children's songs
Songs about animals
Songs about farmers
Songs about fictional male characters
Fictional farms
Fictional farmers
American nursery rhymes
Cumulative songs
Songwriter unknown
1917 songs